Rag Doll Kung Fu is a fighting video game, created predominantly by artist Mark Healey, while working for Lionhead Studios, along with other Lionhead employees, such as David Smith and Alex Evans. Rag Doll Kung Fu is available from Valve's Steam content delivery platform. It is notable as the first third-party published game to be released on Steam. An updated version, called Rag Doll Kung Fu: Fists of Plastic was made available for download on the PlayStation Network for the PlayStation 3 on 9 April 2009.

Gameplay
The game features string puppets that allow for complete control over their hands, arms, and the like. The game is played with the mouse. An online multiplayer feature has been added to the game as well.

Development
The project was announced during an interview with Mark Healey by LHTimes. In the interview, Healey explained that the game was started after he and a few friends made a £50 kung fu film, and Healey felt a game should go along with it. Healey created a site dedicated to Rag Doll Kung Fu on the Lionhead Studios server. In late 2005 Healey, David Smith and Alex Evans left Lionhead Studios to form Media Molecule.

Rag Doll Kung Fu was nominated in the 2006 Develop awards for "New PC IP" and "Innovation". It has also been nominated in the GameShadow Innovation in Games Awards 2006

Reception

References

External links

2005 video games
Fighting games
Martial arts video games
Multiplayer video games
PlayStation 3 games
PlayStation Network games
Sentient toys in fiction
Sony Interactive Entertainment games
Video games about toys
Video games developed in Sweden
Video games developed in the United Kingdom
Windows games